Li Ruishan (November 22, 1920 – October 20, 1997) was a People's Republic of China politician. He was born in Yanchang County, Shaanxi Province. In May 1935, at the age of 14, he joined the Communist Youth League of China and became a member of the Chinese Communist Party in May 1936. He worked at the revolutionary base on the border of Gansu and Ningxia during the Second Sino-Japanese War. He was Chairman of the Revolutionary Committee in his home province (1968-1978). He was a full member of the 9th Central Committee of the Chinese Communist Party, 10th Central Committee of the Chinese Communist Party and 11th Central Committee of the Chinese Communist Party, as well an alternate member of the 12th Central Committee of the Chinese Communist Party.

References

李瑞山 节选自《二十世纪湖南人物》
《怀念中国饲料工业协会的奠基人李瑞山——写在李瑞山同志逝世十周年》，乔玉锋 《饲料工业》杂志 2007年第十五期

1920 births
1997 deaths
People's Republic of China politicians from Shaanxi
Chinese Communist Party politicians from Shaanxi
Governors of Shaanxi
Political office-holders in Shaanxi
Members of the 9th Central Committee of the Chinese Communist Party
Members of the 10th Central Committee of the Chinese Communist Party
Members of the 11th Central Committee of the Chinese Communist Party
Alternate members of the 12th Central Committee of the Chinese Communist Party
People from Yanchang County